Nigel Cumberland is a British author, leadership coach and mentor, and a founder of The Silk Road Partnership. He is the author of nine self-development and leadership books, some of which have been serialised, and also translated into over 25 foreign languages.

Background 
Brought up in the UK, Cumberland is British with a mother who was originally from Myanmar (formerly known as Burma). He read Economics at Queens' College, University of Cambridge. 

Cumberland is an accredited coach and supervisor with the European Mentoring and Coaching Council, and is a Founding Fellow of the Harvard Medical School-affiliated Institute of Coaching. He is also an International Ambassador on the Board of Directors of the US-based International Mentoring Association.

Cumberland regularly writes in the media on career and leadership related topics. He is often interviewed for articles on similar topics. He is regularly invited to chair, facilitate and/or speak at various events.

In 2016, Cumberland was admitted to the Freedom of the City of London.

Bibliography 
 Your Job-Hunt Ltd – Advice from an Award-Winning Asian Headhunter (published by Pilgrims Guides in 2003)
 Your Job-Hunt Ltd – Advice from an Award-Winning Asian Headhunter (a Hong Kong-Chinese language updated Edition published by Wan Li Book Co. Ltd. In 2004)
 Successful Recruitment in a Week – Teach Yourself series (published by Hodder Education in UK & McGraw-Hill Companies, Inc. in US in 2012)
 Managing Teams in a Week – Teach Yourself series (published by Hodder Education in UK & McGraw-Hill Companies Inc. in US in 2013)
 Secrets of Success at Work – 50 techniques to excel (published by Hodder & Stoughton in UK & McGraw-Hill Companies, Inc. in US in 2014)
 Management in 4 Weeks – the Complete Guide to Success Teach Yourself series (one of 4 authors) (published by Hodder & Stoughton in UK & McGraw-Hill Companies, Inc. in US in 2015)
 50 Segredos do Sucesso no Trabalho (published by Self-desenvolvimento Pessoal in Portugal in 2015)
 Recrutamento em Uma Semana (published by Figurati in Brazil in 2015)
 Finding and Hiring Talent in a Week – Teach Yourself series (updated edition of Successful Recruitment in a Week – Teach Yourself series) (published by John Murray Learning in UK & Quercus in US in 2016)
 Leading Teams in a Week – Teach Yourself series (updated edition of Managing Teams in a Week – Teach Yourself series) (published by John Murray Learning in UK & Quercus in US in 2016)
 100 Things Successful People Do: Little Exercises for Successful Living (published in UK by John Murray Learning and in the US by Nicholas Brealey Publishing in 2016, with a second and updated UK edition published in August 2021)
 The Ultimate Management Book – Teach Yourself series (one of 4 authors)(published in the UK by John Murray Learning in 2018)
 100 Things Millionaires Do: Little Lessons in Creating Wealth (published in the UK in November 2019 by Nicholas Brealey Publishing, an imprint of Hodder & Stoughton).
 100 Things Successful Leaders Do: Little Lessons in Leadership (published in the UK in August 2020 & in the USA in December 2020 by Nicholas Brealey Publishing, an imprint of Hodder & Stoughton which is part of Hachette).
 100 Things Productive People Do: Little Lessons in Getting Things Done (published in the UK in August 2022 & in the USA in December 2022 by Nicholas Brealey Publishing, an imprint of Hodder & Stoughton which is part of Hachette; .

References

External links 

The European Mentoring and Coaching Council
The Silk Road Partnership

Living people
English self-help writers
English male non-fiction writers
Motivational writers
Business writers
21st-century English writers
21st-century English male writers
1967 births
Alumni of the University of Cambridge
Alumni of Queens' College, Cambridge
People from York
People educated at Archbishop Holgate's School
People educated at Scarborough College